Chal Shahrgariveh (also Romanized as Chāl Shahrgarīveh) is a village in Sadat Rural District, in the Central District of Lali County, Khuzestan Province, Iran. At the 2006 census, its population was 95, in 18 families.

References 

Populated places in Lali County